Franci Grajš (born December 15, 1986) is a retired Slovenian kickboxer and best 85MAX kickboxer for December 2012.

Biography and career
In August 2011 Grajš participated elimination kickboxing reality show called Enfusion: Trial of the Gladiators. 16 fighters went in Ohrid, Macedonia, lived, trained, and fought each other. In the first round Grajš defeated Michael Kongolo and then in the quarter-finals, he enrolled the biggest career win against veteran Wendell Roche. This victory qualified him for the final 4 tournaments that were held in his country Slovenia.
Final 4 was held on December 2, 2012, in Ljubljana, Slovenia. In the semi-finals, Grajš faced It's showtime 85MAX champion and perhaps the best 85MAX fighter at that time Sahak Parparyan. Grajš won in a tough fight, he was more active in the first two rounds, Parparyan woke up in the third round but that wasn't enough to take the victory. He became Enfusion champion and took 30.000 $ after knocking out Andrew Tate in the final with a jumping knee. Grajš did not just win the Enfusion tournament he also with no doubt, according to the LiverKick portal, became the best fighter in the 85MAX category for December 2012.

Return and retirement

After two years break and changing gym Grajš returned to kickboxing on November 29, 2014 in Novo Mesto, Slovenia at International Muay Thai League event. Grajš, now member of  Nak Muay Gym, lost on points against W.A.K.O. junior world champion, Antonio Plazibat. 

He had to cancel fight against Mladen Kujunđžić at FFC 18 event, due to a nose injury. After that he decided to finish his career, as he could not focus on the fight enough anymore.

Titles
2012 Enfusion: Trial of the Gladiators Tournament Champion
2012 IFMA World Cup Champion
2011 SMTL - Slovenian Muay Thai League Professional Champion -91 kg

Professional kickboxing and muay thai record

See also
 List of male kickboxers

References

Living people
1986 births
Slovenian male kickboxers
Slovenian Muay Thai practitioners